Erick José Téllez Fonseca (born January 28, 1989) is a Nicaraguan professional defender currently playing for Diriangén.

Club career
Téllez has been with Diriangén for his entire career. In September 2013 he was suspended for 6 matches for his part in a mass brawl in a game against rivals Real Estelí.

International career
Téllez made his debut for Nicaragua in a September 2010 friendly match against Guatemala and has, as of July 2017, earned a total of 26 caps, scoring no goals. He has represented his country at the 2011 Copa Centroamericana.

References

External links
 

1989 births
Living people
Sportspeople from Managua
Association football defenders
Nicaraguan men's footballers
Nicaragua international footballers
Diriangén FC players
2011 Copa Centroamericana players
2014 Copa Centroamericana players
2017 Copa Centroamericana players
2017 CONCACAF Gold Cup players